The Norwegian records in swimming are the fastest ever performances of swimmers from Norway, which are recognised and ratified by the Norges Svømmeforbund (NSF).

All records were set in finals unless noted otherwise.

Long Course (50 m)

Men

Women

Mixed relay

Short Course (25 m)

Men

Women

Mixed relay

References
General
 Norwegian records 14 December 2022 updated
Specific

External links
 NSF web site
 

Norway
Records
Swimming
Swimming